Psiloderces elasticus is a species of spider of the genus Psiloderces. It is endemic to Sri Lanka.

See also
 List of Ochyroceratidae species

References

Ochyroceratidae
Endemic fauna of Sri Lanka
Spiders of Asia
Spiders described in 1975